Queen Street is a street in the central business district of Melbourne, Victoria, Australia. The street forms part of the original Hoddle Grid and was laid out in 1837. It runs roughly north-south and is primarily a commercial and financial thoroughfare of the city centre. 

Queen Street is named for Adelaide of Saxe-Meiningen.

Geography 
The northern end of Queen Street intersects with Victoria Street, while its southern end intersects with Flinders Street. Queen Street bisects the Queen Victoria Market into the dry section and wet section.

Notable buildings 
As part of the traditional financial district of Melbourne, Queen Street is home to many buildings listed on Victorian Heritage Register and/or classified by the National Trust of Australia. These include:
 Queen Victoria Market (1878) & Old Melbourne Cemetery (1837)
 John Smith's House (1852)
 Former Bank of New South Wales (1860)
 203 Queen Street (1869)
 Former Titles Office (1875)
 Felton Building (1886)
 Former ES&A (English, Scottish & Australian Bank) Building (1887)
 Lombard Building (1889)
 Former Safe Deposit Building (1891)
 Former Records Office (1904)
 Aldersgate House (1924)
 Alkira House (1937)
 ACA (Australian Catholic Assurance) Building (1937)
 National Trustees Executors & Agency Co (1939)
 Several underground public conveniences
There are also many notable high-rise office buildings along Queen Street, including:
 200 Queen Street (1982) 
 ANZ Bank Tower (1993) 
 Republic Tower (299 Queen Street)
 Bank of China (270 Queen Street)
 Former Fletcher Jones Building (1873)

Architecture

Queen Street massacre 

On 8 December 1987 an armed gunman killed 8 people and injured 5 others at the Australia Post offices at 191 Queen Street. The gunman Frank Vitkovic eventually fell from a building window taking the death toll to 9. 

A memorial window for the victims is located at Melbourne's GPO on Elizabeth and Bourke Streets.

References

See also

Streets in Melbourne City Centre